Medveščak is a neighborhood of the Gornji Grad - Medveščak district in Zagreb, Croatia. According to the 2011 census, 2,648 people make up its population.

The neighborhood is best known for its theatre, Mala Scena Theatre, and Zagreb University's School of Medicine. There is also a small park, Glogovac, situated in the centre. The neighborhood boasts is a variety of high schools, including the II and XVII gymnasiums, a school of midwifery, and various specializing in the creative arts.

An ice hockey club – KHL Medveščak – is the most well-known sports club from Medveščak and the most successful ice hockey club throughout Croatia. The neighborhood also has a fairly successful waterpolo team, VK Medveščak, which was established in 1947.

References

 
Neighbourhoods of Zagreb